Yazawa (written: 矢沢, 矢澤, 谷沢 or 谷澤) is a Japanese surname. Notable people with the surname include:

Ai Yazawa (矢沢 あい, born 1967), Japanese manga author
, Japanese slalom canoeist
Akiko Yazawa (矢澤 亜希子, born 1980), Japanese professional backgammon player
Eikichi Yazawa (矢沢 永吉, born 1949), Japanese singer-songwriter
Erika Yazawa (谷澤 恵里香, born 1990), Japanese gravure idol
, Japanese slalom canoeist
Nao Yazawa (谷沢 直), Japanese manga artist
Tatsuya Yazawa (谷澤 達也, born 1984), Japanese footballer
, Japanese hurdler
Yoko Yazawa (矢沢 洋子, born 1985), Japanese singer-songwriter

Fictional characters
Yazawa - fictional character from Kamen Rider Blade. The human guise of the Capricorn Undead
Nico Yazawa, a character in the anime and franchise Love Live! School Idol Project

Japanese-language surnames